Currituck County Regional Airport  is a county-owned, public-use airport in Currituck County, North Carolina, United States. It is located four nautical miles (5 mi, 7 km) south of the central business district of Currituck, North Carolina. This airport is included in the National Plan of Integrated Airport Systems for 2011–2015, which categorized it as a general aviation facility. It was previously known as Currituck County Airport or Currituck Regional Airport.

Although most U.S. airports use the same three-letter location identifier for the FAA and IATA, this airport is assigned ONX by the FAA but has no designation from the IATA (which assigned ONX to Enrique A. Jiménez Airport in Colón, Panama). The airport's ICAO identifier is KONX.

History
Currituck Regional Airport was built by the United States Army Air Forces about 1942, and was known as Barco Flight Strip.  It was an emergency landing airfield for military aircraft on training flights. It was closed after World War II and was turned over for local government use by the War Assets Administration (WAA). In later years Currituck County took over airport operations. In recent years, Currituck Regional Airport has experienced a constant increase in aircraft based at this field.

Expansion
In an attempt to improve facilities at Currituck Regional Airport, a 20-year Airport Improvement Program has been created in 2000 to identify improvements in the near, short and long term for the airport. Some of these improvements include:
Phase 1 - 0-5 Years (Should already be complete)
 1,500' Extension of Runway 5/23 complete
 Clear obstructions from runway approaches
 Construct new terminal building
Phase 2 - 6-10 Years
Phase 3 - 11-20 Years
Phase 4 - 21+ Years

Facilities and aircraft
Currituck County Regional Airport covers an area of 250 acres (101 ha) at an elevation of 18 feet (5 m) above mean sea level. It has one runway designated 5/23 with an asphalt and concrete surface measuring 5,500 by 150 feet (1,676 x 46 m).

For the 12-month period ending November 9, 2011, the airport had 25,000 aircraft operations, an average of 68 per day: 70% general aviation, 28% military, and 2% air taxi. At that time there were 37 aircraft based at this airport: 84% single-engine, 5% multi-engine, 3% helicopter, and 8% ultralight.

References

 
 Shaw, Frederick J. (2004), Locating Air Force Base Sites History’s Legacy, Air Force History and Museums Program, United States Air Force, Washington DC, 2004.

External links
 Aerial image as of March 1993 from USGS The National Map
 

Airports in North Carolina
Transportation in Currituck County, North Carolina
Buildings and structures in Currituck County, North Carolina
Airfields of the United States Army Air Forces in North Carolina
Flight Strips of the United States Army Air Forces